Ekaterina Illarionovna Kalinchuk (née Dyomina; ; 2 December 1922 – 13 July 1997) was a Soviet gymnast. She competed at the 1952 Summer Olympics in Helsinki, where she was a non-scoring member of the gold-winning Soviet team. Individually she won a gold medal in the vault and a silver in the now-discontinued team portable apparatus event.

References

1922 births
1997 deaths
People from Tula Governorate
Soviet female artistic gymnasts
Gymnasts at the 1952 Summer Olympics
Olympic gymnasts of the Soviet Union
Olympic gold medalists for the Soviet Union
Olympic silver medalists for the Soviet Union
Olympic medalists in gymnastics
Medalists at the 1952 Summer Olympics